Gender equality is the notion that all men and women should receive equal treatment in all aspects and that one should not be discriminated based on their sex. Gender equality is a human right and this is recognised by the United Nations Universal Declaration of Human Rights (UDHR). The right to be free of discrimination on the grounds of sex is found pursuant to Article 2 of the declaration.

Gender equality is increasingly framed as being central to the realisation of both modernisation and economic efficiency, and its achievement presented as a key to good governance. As a result, the New Zealand government has implemented institutional mechanisms to promote the advancement of women and gender equality. In 2016, New Zealand was ranked 9th out of a total of 144 countries in the Global Gender Gap Report which ranks countries in terms of women's gender equality in the population under four heads: economic participation, health, education and political empowerment.

Albeit, New Zealand has committed to supporting the work of the Office of the United Nations High Commissioner for Human Rights (OHCHR) and other key United Nations organisations in agreeing to uphold the UDHR. It has participated in human rights deliberations at the United Nations General Assembly and in the annual session of the United Nations Commission on Human Rights (CHR) and proposes to support the rights of women, children and indigenous people.

Further, New Zealand ratified the Convention on the Elimination of All Forms of Discrimination against Women (CEDAW) on 10 January 1985, and its optional protocol on 7 September 2000. The Ministry for Women is responsible for administrating the CEDAW and its Optional Protocol. The committee on the Elimination of Discrimination against Women makes recommendations on any issues affecting women that the state should address. As of April 2015, the committee has made 29 general recommendations on issues affecting women that states should devote more attention to.

Overview
In the World Economic Forum’s annual report on the global gender gap, New Zealand was ranked in 9th place in 2016. The Global Gender Gap Index ranks countries on how far women are behind men in regards to health, education and economic and political indicators. Instances, where women have rated ahead of men, are not counted as inequality.

New Zealand is a party to the Organisation for Economic Co-operation and Development (OECD). In the OECD's final report on Gender Equality in Education, Employment and Entrepreneurship it was found that women in New Zealand do more unpaid work than paid work, gain more tertiary qualifications than men and women-owned new enterprises outperform men-owned enterprises.

Nonetheless, despite the gap between wage equality slowly closing in, the report found that the government funding allocated to reduce gender inequality in New Zealand is on the low side in comparison to other countries in the OECD.

History
Throughout history, gender inequality has generally affected women more so than men. As a result, there has been a lot of controversy in respect of the matter and activism since the 19th century.

New Zealand has had a long history of promoting women's equality. It was the first nation in the world to give women the right to vote in the 19th century. Previously, women were unable to vote until 1893 and were not able to stand for parliament until 1919. The first woman to win an election was Elizabeth McCombs in 1933. Iriaka Rātana was the first Maori woman MP in 1949 and Dame Jenny Shipley was the first woman to be prime minister in New Zealand from 1997 to 1999.

Historical inequalities for men include the prohibition of homosexuality for men until the homosexual law reform bill in 1986 and military conscription.

Legislation for gender equity
The legal framework in New Zealand provides comprehensive protection against all forms of discrimination covered by the CEDAW.

In 1973 The Domestic Purpose Benefit (now the sole parent or jobseeker support) was introduced for all parents caring for dependent children without the support of a partner (mainly women). The Accident Compensation Amendment Act 2010 also extended compensation to non-earners, benefiting women who do full-time unpaid work in the domestic home.

New Zealand has also enacted a number of legislative means to provide for equal pay for women, outlawing sexual discrimination and sexual harassment in the workplace and proposes to set out rights in regards to equal employment for career progression in the workplace.

Legislation in respect of gender equality in the workplace include the Equal Pay Act 1972, the State Sector Act 1988 and the Human Rights Act 1993. 

The New Zealand Bill of Rights Act 1990 protects all New Zealand citizens from discrimination on the basis of sex.

Discriminatory laws 
New Zealand still has some old laws which have not been repealed or replaced.

Male assaults on females 
Section 194 of the Crimes Act, ‘assault on a child, or by a male on a female’, sets the maximum penalty for a male assaulting a female at two years and such assaults are not covered by the less restrictive 'bail as of right' provisions. The equivalent charge of common assault has a maximum one-year penalty and is covered by 'bail as of right' provisions.

The Law Commission reviewed the Crimes Act in 2009 and recommended a repeal of this law and suggested that the maximum penalty for common assault be increased so that the more serious cases can still be dealt with appropriately.

The proposed Family and Whānau Violence Legislation Bill seeks to address the limitations of using ‘male assaults female’ as a mechanism to address domestic violence, however Amy Adams explicitly recommended keeping 'male assaults female'.

There are some other laws refer to ‘male assaults female’ which creates further gender inequalities. The Criminal Investigations (Bodily Samples) Act 1995 allows investigators the ability to take bodily samples from people accused of certain crimes. The gender neutral equivalent, common assault, is not included in the act.

Infanticide 
A woman can be charged with the lesser crime of infanticide if she kills her child and "the balance of her mind was disturbed". There is no equivalent for men. In New Zealand, there is at least one case of a man being charged with murder where if he was a woman he would have been charged with infanticide.

"Otago University law professor Kevin Dawkins ... said he would like to see infanticide replaced with another partial defence of diminished responsibility, to apply to female and male offenders."

Adoption 
The Adoption Act 1955 prevents males from adopting female children in certain cases.

Preventing gender inequality in proposed legislation 
New Zealand has a mechanism to prevent gender inequality in the proposed legislation. Section 7 of the Bill of Right Act requires the Attorney General to report to Parliament if a bill appears to be inconsistent with the non-discrimination requirements of the act. However, parliament is not bound by these reports.

Papers presented to cabinet are required to undergo a gender analysis by the Ministry for Women to determine the potential impacts on women and girls.

Developments and present status
In the past century, the gender gap in New Zealand has been slowly closing in and there has been an increase in women's rights and feminism. The government is making steady progress and it is evident that the fundamentals for equal rights are all in place: democracy, the rule of law and an independent judiciary. The government has also implemented effective structures of governance, specialized human rights and other accountability mechanisms, and has recognised the vulnerability of particular groups and individuals.

Although New Zealand consistently ranks in the top half dozen of countries in the world when it comes to equality between men and women, it is not complacent in terms of gender equality. New Zealand women still do not experience the full equality guaranteed by the law. Across the economy, women's skills are under-used in leadership and women continue to earn less than men – even if they have the same qualifications, and similar job descriptions. Family violence also continues to be a cause of considerable disquiet.

However, many of the remaining gender gaps in New Zealand do not appear to be a conscious disregard to the law (as there is comprehensive legislation in place), rather it is largely based on subconscious prejudice and factors like occupational segregation.

Political and public representation
New Zealand has had a high level of participation by women in public life and this is evident from the modest female representation in politics and the judiciary. However, women continue to be under represented in parliament. Currently, there is a 40.8% female representation in parliament.

At present there are no adopted quotas and targets to increase the number of women to ensure the equal representation of women in all publicly appointed bodies by the New Zealand Government. Rather, the government has developed a policy of ‘soft targets’ to promote equal representation. This was criticized by the Human Rights Commission as being insufficient as there is no dedicated machinery to guide it.

Employment and the workplace
The government's current goals and priorities in terms of employment equality for New Zealand women are linked to its broader goal of improving New Zealand's prosperity in the economy. This is to allow women to have more choices and opportunities to use their strengths to maximize social and economical success.

The New Zealand workforce shows a pattern of occupational segregation. For example, women tend to work in lower paying jobs, which contributes, in part, to the wage gap. Dangerous jobs tend to be mainly male occupations, leading to significantly more workplace injuries and deaths among men.

With regard to pay equity, the domestic gender pay gap in New Zealand when comparing full-time workers is rather low in comparison to other countries. The gender pay gap in New Zealand was calculated to be 9.9% in 2014, which was the lowest in the Asia Pacific Region.

In terms of New Zealand labour force participation, the female unemployment rate is statistically higher than that of men (with the unemployment rate being the highest for Māori and Pacific women). Women generally have higher rates of participation in all categories of unpaid work – within and outside of the household. The amount of part-time workers in New Zealand are three quarters women. Various demographics of women take on more part-time work than men.

Section 21 of the Human Rights Act 1993 prohibits discrimination in the workplace on the grounds of sex (including pregnancy and child birth), marital status and family status.

Gender equality is a topic in the workforce that has received increasing discussion and momentum. New Zealand started as the first nation to have full voting rights for women in 1893. From there, women entered the workforce in the 1960s, although the participation rate of men and women at the time was 81 percent and 67 percent respectively. The report from the New Zealand census of Women's participation in Government and Professional Life shows 60 percent of women have no position of the top 100 corporations. According to advocacy group Global Women, in 2019, 18 percent of companies listed on NZX, did not have female representation on their board. As of September 2020, 22.5 percent of directors on NZX listed companies are women, with the top 50 listed companies having higher proportions of female directors (31.6%) than all other listed companies (15.9%). Approximately 63 percent of women's work in New Zealand is unpaid, compared to 35 percent of men's work. The goals of the New Zealand policy is to achieve women's representation in these organizations. Along with this, large corporations are encouraged to meet with the Ministry for Women. New Zealand has utilized ways to further improve gender equality, by creating gender analysis tools so that various aspects can be further developed.

Feminists in New Zealand have developed their goal of creating greater equality for women. Equal economic agenda is a pillar of the liberal feminist ideas stemming from the 1980s. The aim of these organizations is to create greater economic independence for women. The goal of these programs is to increase representation for women and help them gain further recognition in the economic sector.

The development of different policies towards greater equality in the workforce is championed by the various women's organizations in New Zealand. The Women's Affairs is recognized on a national level in the country.

The Ministry also created interactive relationships with different female organizations. The workforce has benefited from the government interaction with women's organizations and helped to understand the change in the various female demographics in the economic sector. The commitment of the government to provide an equal working field is an important aspect of equality for women in New Zealand. There is a National Action Plan to implement UNSC Resolution 1325, which is dedicated to Peace and Security for women.

Education

Primary school 
In years 1-8 fewer boys than girls are meeting national standards according to 2015 figures.
 For reading, 73.9% of boys and 82.4% of girls are meeting national standards. 8.5 percentage points difference
 For writing, 63.9% of boys and 79.4% of girls are meeting standards. 15.5 percentage points difference
 For maths, 74.8 percent of boys and 76.2% of girls are meeting standards. 1.4 percentage points difference

Secondary school 
Fewer boys stay in school until 17, 81.4% compared to 86.5% (5.1 percentage points difference) 
 Boys are behind girls at NCEA level 1 attainment by 2.7 percentage points (89.8% vs 87.1%)
 At NCEA level 2 boys lag 4.8 percentage points (85.8% vs 81.0%)
 At level 3 girls are 14.2 percentage points ahead (60.0% vs 45.8%)

Tertiary education 
Women are 60% of those who gain tertiary certificates and diplomas. Women also earn 60% of bachelor's degrees and above. 54.1% of STEM graduates are women, however women make up only 22.9% of engineering graduates, 27.9% of IT graduates, and only 11.1% of apprenticeships.

Not in education, employment, or training 
Women outnumber men for 15 to 24-year-olds who are not in employment, education or training (NEET). In 2016 12.9% of women were NEET, compared to 10.1% of men.

Family assets and resources
The Administration Act 1976 (section 77) provides for equal inheritance rights for sons and daughters and there is no evidence of discrimination in practice, or under any informal customary systems.

New Zealand women have the right to non-discrimination in the ownership and access to land. The Maori Land Act 1993 provides for gender equality in the control and use of land and resources. In terms of non-land assets, there are no restrictions on their equal rights to property, regardless of marital status.

Women also have the equal right to financial services pursuant to the Human Rights 1993.

Health
Women can access the same comprehensive range of health services as men, as well as having a range of services in place specifically designed for women's health needs – such as maternity services and population screening programmes.

On average, women have better health outcomes than men and women generally have a higher life expectancy. However, there are areas in which New Zealand does not fare so well in terms of health. New Zealand has one of the highest teen pregnancy rates in the OECD with the Māori teen pregnancy rate being rather high.

Suicide 
For the 2016/17 year there were 457 male suicides and 149 female suicides. The suicide rate per 100,000 population was 19.36 for males and 6.12. Traditionally the ratio is about 3:1 male to female.

Life Expectancy 
The New Zealand life expectancy at birth for babies born between 2012 and 2014 was 79.5 years for males and 83.2 years for females, which is a difference of 3.7 years.

A male New Zealander born in 2013 can expect to live for an average of 65.2 years independently,  and another 14.3 years with some level of disability requiring support.

Females can expect to live for an average of 66.5 years independently and another 16.7 years with functional limitations that require support.

At birth, therefore, females can expect to live independently for 1.3 years longer than males. They can also expect to live 2.4 years longer with disability requiring assistance than males

Domestic violence

The Domestic Violence Act 1995 addresses domestic and family violence against women and pursuant to the act domestic violence can be charged as a criminal offence.

In New Zealand the government has implemented specialist family violence courts and means-tested legal aid services which provide referral and advocacy as well as applicant support and outreach for victims of domestic violence. The New Zealand government has made steady progress in implementing fundamental criminal justice reforms that strengthen victim's rights and aims to provide greater protection for those at threat of family violence – most of whom are women victims of male violence.

The social attitudes in New Zealand currently remain an impediment to combatting domestic violence and as such, is one of the major barriers in achieving gender equity in New Zealand. In essence the relatively strong legal framework is not always effectively implemented and domestic violence continues to be a challenge for New Zealand society. It is estimated that only 18% of family violence cases are reported to the police and 84% of those arrested for domestic violence are men.

However the attitudes towards family violence in New Zealand are in the midst of change as a result of a sustained national campaign - The Campaign for Action on Violence within Families, which aims at changing social attitudes towards family violence. The government has also implemented similar programmes designed specifically for Maori, Pacific and migrant women which are endorsed by their communities.

Rates of partner and sexual violence against women had a statistically significant reduction from 2005 to 2013. "The annual rate of partner violence offences against women decreased from 8.6 percent in 2005 to 5.7 percent in 2013. The annual rate of sexual violence offences against women decreased from 5.2 percent in 2005 to 2.9 percent in 2013."

The Ministry of Health currently discourages care providers from routinely enquiring with patients about intimate partner violence where males are victims, stating, "Routine enquiry is not recommended because of the differences in prevalence and severity of violence against men. However, if signs and symptoms of IPV are present, males should also be questioned about the occurrence of IPV, or other experiences of violence."

The latest New Zealand Crime and Safety Survey found that 4.4% of males and 5.7% of females reported one or more incidents of partner violence in the 12 months preceding the survey.

See also
Gender pay gap in New Zealand
Feminism in New Zealand

References

External links
http://women.govt.nz/sites/public_files/cedaw-2010.pdf
http://women.govt.nz/documents/status-women-new-zealand-cedaw-report-2006
http://women.govt.nz/sites/public_files/CEDAW%20concluding%20observations%202012.pdf
http://women.govt.nz/sites/public_files/CEDAW%20report%20follow-up%202014_0.pdf
http://reports.weforum.org/global-gender-gap-report-2014/economies/#economy=NZL

Gender in New Zealand
New Zealand
Women's rights in New Zealand